Delian Island is an island found in the Calamianes Islands in the province of Palawan, Philippines.

Geography 
The average elevation of the island is 76 m above sea level.

Population 
An estimated 2.82% of the children below 5 years old living in the island are underweight.

Weather 
April is the warmest month with an average temperature of 32.3 °C at noon while January is the coldest month with an average temperature of 22.6 °C at night. The island has no distinct temperature seasons, the temperature is relatively constant during the year. The temperatures do not differ much between day and night. September is on average the month with most sunshine. The wet season has a rainfall peak around October, the dry season is around the month of March.

Natural Disasters 
There is a medium-high occurrence of periods of extreme drought. There is an extremely high chance of cyclones hitting the island.

See also

 List of islands of the Philippines

References 

Calamian Islands